is a passenger railway station located in the city of Ōtsu, Shiga Prefecture, Japan, operated by the private railway company Keihan Electric Railway.

Lines

Station layout
The station consists of two opposed unnumbered side platforms connected by a level crossing.  The station is unattended.

Platforms

Adjacent stations

History
Karahashimae Station was opened on January 17, 1914.

Passenger statistics
In fiscal 2018, the station was used by an average of 800 passengers daily (boarding passengers only).

Surrounding area
 Seto no Karahashi
 Otsu City Seiran Elementary School
 Shiga Prefectural Seta Technical High School
 Japan National Route 422

See also
List of railway stations in Japan

References

External links

Keihan official home page

Railway stations in Shiga Prefecture
Stations of Keihan Electric Railway
Railway stations in Japan opened in 1914
Railway stations in Ōtsu